"If I Were You" is a song by Australian country music singer-songwriter Kasey Chambers, produced by her brother Nash Chambers for her second studio album, Barricades & Brickwalls (2001). It was released as the album's fifth and final single on 14 October 2002, peaking at number 32 on the Australian Singles Chart.

Track listing
Australian CD single
 "If I Were You" – 4:10
 "Nullarbor Song" (live) – 4:52
 "Changed the Locks" (live) – 4:20
 "Million Tears" (live) – 5:08
 Tracks two to four are taken from the DVD Kasey Chambers – Behind the Barricades.

Charts

Release history

References

2001 songs
2002 singles
EMI Records singles
Kasey Chambers songs
Songs written by Kasey Chambers
Warner Records singles